Liu Mingzu (September 1936 – 28 December 2022) was a regional Chinese politician. He served as the Chinese Communist Party Secretary for the Inner Mongolia Autonomous Region, therefore the top leader of the region, from 1994 to 2001, and before that, the deputy party chief of Guangxi, also an autonomous region.

Liu was born in the rural outskirts of Weihai, Shandong province, in what is present-day Huancui District; he went to Dalian with his mother to reunite with his father there. Liu joined the Chinese Communist Party in 1959, and spent his early career in various incarnations of the Weihai municipal office before, during, and after the Cultural Revolution. In 1986 he was named prefecture party chief of Linyi, Shandong. In 1988 he was transferred to become deputy party chief of Guangxi, then in 1993 also became chair of the regional People's Congress. He was then transferred to Inner Mongolia. After his retirement from active 'frontline' politics, he was named chair of the National People's Congress Agriculture and Rural Affairs Committee in 2003, where he served one term, before leaving politics for good.

Liu was an alternate member of the 14th Central Committee of the Chinese Communist Party and a full member of the 15th Central Committee.

References

1936 births
2022 deaths
People from Weihai
Political office-holders in Inner Mongolia
People's Republic of China politicians from Shandong
Chinese Communist Party politicians from Shandong
Political office-holders in Guangxi
Deaths from the COVID-19 pandemic in China